The 1989 Notre Dame Fighting Irish football team represented the University of Notre Dame in the 1989 NCAA Division I-A football season. The team was coached by Lou Holtz and played its home games at Notre Dame Stadium in South Bend, Indiana.

Schedule

Personnel

Season summary

vs Virginia

Largest crowd for college football game at Giants Stadium

at Michigan

Michigan State

at Purdue

at Stanford

at Air Force

Raghib Ismail 180 all-purpose yards

USC

Pregame fight in tunnel

Pittsburgh

Navy

SMU

at Penn State

Notre Dame's first win in school history at Beaver Stadium

at Miami (FL)

Orange Bowl (vs Colorado)

Team players drafted into the NFL
The following players were drafted into professional football following the season.

Awards and honors
 Tony Rice, Johnny Unitas Golden Arm Award
 Tony Rice finished 4th in voting for the Heisman Trophy.
 Raghib Ismail finished in a tie for 10th in voting for the Heisman Trophy.

References

Notre Dame
Notre Dame Fighting Irish football seasons
Orange Bowl champion seasons
Notre Dame Fighting Irish football